

Afro-Seminole Creole (ASC) is a dialect of Gullah spoken by Black Seminoles in scattered communities in Oklahoma, Texas, and Northern Mexico.  
  
Afro-Seminole Creole was first identified in 1978 by Ian Hancock, a linguist at the University of Texas.  Before that, no one in the academic world was aware of its existence. ASC arose when enslaved Gullah speakers from the South Carolina and Georgia coastal region, later called "Black Seminoles," escaped from slavery on rice plantations and fled into the Florida wilderness. This process began in the late 1600s, and continued into the 1830s. In Florida, the Black Seminoles built their own independent communities, but established a close partnership with the Seminole Indians. That alliance helped protect both groups during the First and Second Seminole Wars.

The present-day speakers of Afro-Seminole Creole live in Seminole County, Oklahoma and Brackettville, Texas in the United States, and in Nacimiento de los Negros, Coahuila, Mexico. ASC is threatened with extinction as there are only about 200 native speakers today. The speakers of ASC are all descendants of the Black Seminoles who settled in Florida and then, through a series of wars and other threats, were driven first to what is now Oklahoma and Northern Mexico, and later into Texas after the Civil War. The speakers of ASC are all 65 years of age or older, so unless actions are soon taken, ASC will likely be extinct in one or two decades.

See also 

Black Seminoles
Seminole
Gullah language
Krio language
 Mascogos
Muskogean languages
Ian Hancock

Notes

References

External links
https://web.archive.org/web/20050511220455/http://www.linguasphere.org/anglo_creole.pdf

American Creole
English-based pidgins and creoles
Languages of Mexico
Languages of the United States
Multiracial affairs in the United States
Black Seminoles
Languages of the African diaspora
English language in North America